Patrick Lamont McNeil (born February 28, 1954) is a former professional American football running back. He played college football at Baylor University. He was drafted by the Kansas City Chiefs in 1976 NFL Draft in the 17th round (472nd overall pick). He played during the 1976 and 1977 seasons.

References

1964 births
Living people
American football running backs
Baylor Bears football players
Edmonton Elks players
Kansas City Chiefs players
People from Pittsburg, California
Players of American football from California
Sportspeople from the San Francisco Bay Area